Albion Cricket Club is a cricket club based in Dunedin, New Zealand.

Founded in 1862, it is reputedly the oldest continuously existing club in either New Zealand or Australia.

In 2013, Albion stalwart Warwick Larkins, convener of the 150th celebrations, enquired in Sydney, Melbourne and Adelaide and found:

The club's home ground is at Culling Park in Musselburgh.

List of internationals 
Albion's roll of honour contains the names of many current and former international players, among them the following:

Brendon Bracewell
John Bracewell
Mark Craig
Alexander Downes
Harry Graham
Syd Hiddleston
Billy Ibadulla
Andrew Jones
Brendon McCullum
Nathan McCullum
Barry Milburn
Rachel Pullar
Mark Richardson
Ken Rutherford
Bert Sutcliffe
Martin Snedden
Clare Taylor
Jonathan Trott
Glenn Turner
 Neil Wagner

As well as these internationals, the club boasts many more first-class players.

300 Club
One of the many quirks about Albion is the fact it was home to a group of 5 players to have scored first class triple centuries.
Glenn Turner
Mark Richardson
Brendon McCullum
Bert Sutcliffe
Ken Rutherford

Banners
The club has won the Dunedin senior cricket banner on thirteen occasions, and shared the honours on three further occasions.

References

External links 
Club website

Sport in Dunedin
Cricket teams in New Zealand
Organisations based in Dunedin
1862 establishments in New Zealand
Cricket clubs established in 1862